Helmut Metzler (born 5 March 1945) is an Austrian footballer. He played in six matches for the Austria national football team from 1967 to 1969.

References

External links
 

1945 births
Living people
Austrian footballers
Austria international footballers
Place of birth missing (living people)
Association footballers not categorized by position